Roberto Tenga (born 25 January 1990) is an Italian rugby union player.
His usual position is as a Prop and he currently plays for Fiamme Oro in Top12.

Tenga played for Zebre from 2017 to 2020.

In 2016 and 2017, Tenga was named in the Emerging Italy squad for the 2016 World Rugby Nations Cup and 2017 World Rugby Nations Cup.

References

External links 
It's rugby France Profile
Player Profile
ESPN Profile

1990 births
Living people
Rugby union props